East Changji Road is a station on the branch line of Line 11 of the Shanghai Metro. It opened on April 26, 2011.

References 
 

Railway stations in Shanghai
Line 11, Shanghai Metro
Shanghai Metro stations in Jiading District
Railway stations in China opened in 2010